Typhoon Mirinae, known in the Philippines as Typhoon Santi, was the 34th depression and the 14th typhoon in the 2009 Pacific typhoon season. It came several weeks after Typhoons Ketsana and Parma devastated the Philippines, thus adding additional damage wrought by the two preceding typhoons.

Meteorological history

Early on October 10, 2009, the Joint Typhoon Warning Center (JTWC) reported that an area of convection was developing over an elongated and broad low level circulation center within a monsoon trough about 500 km, 315 miles to the southeast of Pohnpei. The low level circulation center was located under a region of favourable divergence, however it was located in area of moderate to high vertical windshear which was hampering the low level circulation centers attempts to organize. Over the next couple of days the vertical windshear relaxed and as a result convection started to develop further with a Tropical Cyclone Formation Alert being issued by the JTWC late on October 25 after the Japan Meteorological Agency (JMA) had designated the disturbance as a weak tropical depression.

Preparations

Northern Mariana Islands

Early on October 26, the National Weather Service Weather Forecast Office in Tiyan, Guam placed Guam, Rota, Tinian and Saipan under a tropical storm watch which meant that tropical storm force winds were possible on the islands within 48 hours. They then upgraded the watch for Rota, Tinian and Saipan to a Tropical Storm Warning as tropical storm force winds were now expected on the islands within 24 hours. These warnings and watches were kept in force until they were cancelled early the next day after the tropical depression had moved away and intensified into a tropical storm.

Philippines

Highest Public Storm Warning Signal

Vietnam
 Along with the Philippines, Vietnam was still recovering from Typhoon Ketsana, which brought the Philippine capital, Manila, its worst flooding in 40 years and went on to kill more than 160 people in Vietnam in late September, 2009.

Mirinae made landfall in the coastal province of Phu Yen on November 2. More than 100 people were killed in the subsequent flooding.

Impact

Philippines
Throughout the Philippines, Mirinae killed 39 people and left roughly $100.1 million in damage.

Vietnam
Torrential rainfall produced by Mirinae in Vietnam triggered catastrophic flooding, killing total 124 people. Roughly 2,400 homes were destroyed by swift currents and 437,300 hectares of crops were flooded. Damage was counted as 5.8 trillion đồng (US$323 million).

See also
 2009 Pacific typhoon season
 Effects of the 2009 Pacific typhoon season in the Philippines
 Typhoon Nari (2013)
 Typhoon Hagupit (2014)
 Typhoon Damrey (2017)

References

External links

JMA General Information of Typhoon Mirinae (0921) from Digital Typhoon
JMA Best Track Data of Typhoon Mirinae (0921) 
JTWC Best Track Data of Typhoon 23W (Mirinae)
23W.MIRINAE from the U.S. Naval Research Laboratory

2009 Pacific typhoon season
2009 in Vietnam
Santi
Santi
Typhoons
Minirae